Parker Thompson (born 2 March 1998) is a Canadian race car driver from Red Deer, Alberta, Canada.

Career

Early career 
Thompson began racing at the age of eight, competing in the Calgary Kart Racing Club a short distance from his family residence in Red Deer, Alberta, Canada. From the local club, Thompson graduated to the global ranks of karting. In 2012 he finished 3rd in the junior category of the Rotax World Karting Finals in Portimao, Portugal. In 2013 he joined the World Series of Karting with team Energy Corse where he earned eight top five finishes, four podium finishes, five Superpole sessions, two Superpole wins and a final win.

Open wheel career 
In 2015, Thompson began competition in open-wheel racing, with a focus on the Road to Indy. Thompson finished 2nd place overall in the 2016 U.S. F2000 Championship with Cape Motorsports. In 2018, he finished 2nd place overall again, this time in the Pro Mazda Championship, with Exclusive Autosport. After a total of six seasons on the Road to Indy (2015-2020) he holds the record for the most top-five finishes across all series.

Thompson also participated in other open-wheel championship series. Driving for Exclusive Autosport, he was the Canadian Formula 1600 Super Series Champion in 2017.

Sports car racing 
In 2019 Thompson initiated a move into sports car racing, participating in the IMSA GT3 Cup Challenge in Canada and the United States, as well as the Canadian Touring Car Championship where he was the GTS class champion. 2021 and 2022 saw Thompson compete full time in the IMSA Porsche Carrera Cup North America as a pro-class entry with JDX Racing. After placing 3rd in the 2021 season championship, Thompson earned the season's championship title in 2022.

In 2023 he joined Vasser Sullivan Racing racing to pilot the #12 Lexus RC F GT3 in GTD class in the IMSA SportsCar Championship at all Michelin Endurance Cup events.

Racing record

Career summary

* Season still in progress.

Motorsports career results

American sports car racing results

IMSA GT3 Cup Challenge America

IMSA Carrera Cup North America

American open-wheel racing results

U.S. F2000 National Championship

Indy Pro 2000 Championship

Canadian regional racing results

Formula 1600 Super Series

Canadian Touring Car Championship

IMSA GT3 Cup Challenge Canada

References

External links
Official Website

Parker Thompson official Pro Mazda stats
Parker Thompson official U.S. F2000 stats
2017 Formula 1600 Super Series official results
IMSA Porsche GT3 Cup USA official results
IMSA Results official results

1998 births
Living people
Canadian racing drivers
U.S. F2000 National Championship drivers
Indy Pro 2000 Championship drivers
Racing drivers from Alberta
Sportspeople from Red Deer, Alberta
JDC Motorsports drivers
Wayne Taylor Racing drivers
WeatherTech SportsCar Championship drivers